Junodia beieri is a species of praying mantis found in the Congo River region.

See also
List of mantis genera and species

References

Junodia
Mantodea of Africa
Insects described in 1972